Nindowari, also known as Nindo Damb, is a Kulli archaeological site, dating back to chalcolithic period, in Kalat District of Balochistan, Pakistan. Archaeological investigation of the site suggests that the Nindowari complex was occupied by the Harappans before the Kulli civilization arrived and that the Kulli culture was related to or possibly derived from the Harappan culture.

Location
It is located on the right bank of the Kud River, a tributary of the Porali River.

History

Nindowari is a site of the prehistoric Kulli culture of Balochistan with links to the Harappan Civilization.
The settlement was built on a flat schist bed with a central quadrangular platform which was surrounded by buildings on one side. Mounds of various heights were located in the area. The summit of the mound was accessed via a staircase from the platform showing this mound was considered a monument. The site offers evidence that Kulli culture might be strongly associated with the Harappan Civilization if not directly derived from it. Artifacts excavated from the site show that the two cultures had close interaction.

The site was probably abandoned due to a major uplift which resulted in cutting off of the water source from the Kud River.

Excavations
The site was discovered by Beatrice De Cardi in 1957. French Archaeological Mission, led by Jean-Marie Casal, and Department of Archaeology, Pakistan later carried out the Nindowari excavations from 1962 till 1965, uncovering traces of a Kulli settlement dating back to the third millennium BC. These excavations unearthed Kulli-Harappan pottery and vases with animal figures, mostly bulls and birds. Terracotta figurines of women adorned with jewelry with elaborate details were also discovered. Nal ware (old pottery from Indus Civilization) excavated from the site suggested a pre-Kulli occupation and that the Harrapans were settled in the area in early periods (3200 - 2500 BC).

Status
Nindo Dam is one of the 27 notified Archaeological Sites and Monuments in Balochistan and protected by the Federal Government under the Federal Antiquities Act.

References

Indus Valley civilisation sites
Kalat District
Archaeological sites in Balochistan, Pakistan
Pre-Indus Valley civilisation sites